Liechtenstein competed at the 2018 Winter Olympics in Pyeongchang, South Korea, from 9 to 25 February 2018.

On 17 February, Tina Weirather won the bronze medal in alpine skiing and became Liechtenstein's first Olympic medalist since the 1988 Winter Olympics in Calgary, when  
Paul Frommelt won the bronze medal in the Men's slalom. The country ranked 28th in the medal table.

Medalists

Competitors
The following is the list of number of competitors participating in the Games per sport.

Alpine skiing 

Liechtenstein qualified two athletes, one male and one female.

Cross-country skiing 

Liechtenstein qualified two athletes, one male and one female. However, the country rejected the female quota spot.

Distance

See also
Liechtenstein at the 2018 Summer Youth Olympics

References

Nations at the 2018 Winter Olympics
2018
2018 in Liechtenstein sport